The 2021 season was Central Sparks' second season, in which they competed in the 50 over Rachael Heyhoe Flint Trophy and the new Twenty20 competition, the Charlotte Edwards Cup. The side finished third in the Rachael Heyhoe Flint Trophy, with 5 wins from their 7 matches, therefore advancing to the play-off stage. There, they played Northern Diamonds, but lost by 6 wickets. In the Charlotte Edwards Cup, the side finished third in Group A, winning 3 of their 6 matches.
 
The side was captained by Evelyn Jones and coached by Lloyd Tennant. They played three home matches at New Road, two at Edgbaston Cricket Ground and one at Edgbaston Foundation Ground.

Squad
Central Sparks announced their initial 19-player squad on 26 May 2021. Davina Perrin was promoted to the senior squad from the Academy during the season, and played her first match on 10 September 2021. Age given is at the start of Central Sparks' first match of the season (29 May 2021).

Rachael Heyhoe Flint Trophy

Season standings

 Advanced to the final
 Advanced to the play-off

Fixtures

Play-off

Tournament statistics

Batting

Source: ESPN Cricinfo Qualification: 100 runs.

Bowling

Source: ESPN Cricinfo Qualification: 5 wickets.

Charlotte Edwards Cup

Group A

 Advanced to the final
 Advanced to the semi-final

Fixtures

Tournament statistics

Batting

Source: ESPN Cricinfo Qualification: 50 runs.

Bowling

Source: ESPN Cricinfo Qualification: 5 wickets.

Season statistics

Batting

Bowling

Fielding

Wicket-keeping

References

Central Sparks seasons
2021 in English women's cricket